Degrees of general hardness (dGH or °GH) is a unit of water hardness, specifically of general hardness. General hardness is a measure of the concentration of divalent metal ions such as calcium (Ca2+) and magnesium (Mg2+) per volume of water. Specifically, 1 dGH is defined as 10 milligrams (mg) of calcium oxide (CaO) per litre of water. Since CaO has a molar mass of 56.08 g/mol, 1 dGH is equivalent to 0.17832 mmol per litre of elemental calcium and/or magnesium ions.

In water testing, paper strips often measure hardness in parts per million (ppm), where one part per million is defined as one milligram of calcium carbonate (CaCO3) per litre of water.  Consequently, 1 dGH corresponds to 10 ppm CaO but 17.848 ppm CaCO3 which has a molar mass of 100.09 g/mol.

See also

Carbonate hardness
Hard water
dKH

External links 
 Water Hardness definitions
 Water hardness calculator 

Units of measurement
Water chemistry